Amel Moussa is a Tunisian poet, teacher and journalist. She has published two books of poetry, and her poems have been translated in Italian, Spanish, French, Polish, German and Czech. She has won Tunisia's National Creative Award for her poetry and an award from the Arab Women’s Organization for her journalism in Tunisia.

In 2021, she was appointed to government. She is Minister Family, Women, Children and the Elderly in the Bouden Cabinet.

Selected works

Poetry collections 

 Ontha al-ma' (The water female), 1996
 Khajal al-yakout (The emerald's bashfulness), 1998

References 

Tunisian women poets
Tunisian women journalists
Year of birth missing (living people)
Living people
21st-century Tunisian women writers
21st-century Tunisian poets

Women government ministers of Tunisia
21st-century Tunisian women politicians
21st-century Tunisian politicians
Independent politicians in Tunisia